Owl's spiny rat (Carterodon sulcidens) is a rodent species in the family Echimyidae found in Brazil.  It is the only species in the genus Carterodon. Owl's spiny rat has evolved characteristics such as a heightened ability to dig in open grasslands during times of environmental change.

Phylogeny
The genus Carterodon is the sister group to the family Capromyidae (hutias). In turn, this clade shares evolutionary affinities with some genera of spiny rats belonging to the subfamily Euryzygomatomyinae.

Analyses of craniodental characters proposed that Carterodon may be associated with Clyomys and Euryzygomatomys.
However, molecular data suggest the polyphyly of this assemblage of fossorial genera.

References

Echimyidae
Mammals described in 1841
Taxa named by Peter Wilhelm Lund

oc:Carterodon